The name Melor has been used to name three tropical cyclones in the northwestern Pacific Ocean. The name was contributed by Malaysia, which means a jasmine flower.

 Severe Tropical Storm Melor (2003) (T0319, 24W, Viring) – A Category 1 typhoon that affected the Philippines, Taiwan and Japan.
 Typhoon Melor (2009) (T0918, 20W, Quedan) – A Category 5 typhoon that struck Japan.
 Typhoon Melor (2015) (T1527, 28W, Nona) – A Category 4 typhoon that struck the Philippines

The  name Melor was retired by the WMO Typhoon Committee following the 2015 typhoon season and replaced with Cempaka in the 2021 season, which means Plant that known for its Fragant Flowers.

Pacific typhoon set index articles